Oak sedge may refer to:

 Carex pensylvanica, common oak sedge or Pennsylvania sedge
 Carex albicans, white-tinged sedge or oak sedge